The Nepal–Britain Treaty was signed on 1 November 1860 in Kathmandu by Jung Bahadur Rana on behalf of King Surendra Bikram Shah and by George Ramsay on the part of Charles Canning, 1st Earl Canning, Governor-General of India. The treaty was ratified on 15 November 1860 in Calcuta.

The restored the Terai lands ceded by the Treaty of Sugauli, which included districts of Kanchanpur, Kailali, Bardiya, and Banke.

Terms of the Treaty 
The terms of the 1860 Nepal Britain Treaty were:

See also 

 Treaty of Sugauli
 Nepal–Britain Treaty of 1923

References 

Bilateral treaties of the United Kingdom
Treaties of Nepal
Peace treaties of the United Kingdom
Treaties concluded in 1860
Treaties entered into force in 1860
1860 in Asia
Nepal–United Kingdom relations
Treaties extended to British India
1860 in Nepal